is a Japanese former football player who last played for Yokohama F. Marinos. He played for Japan national team.

Club career
Kurihara was born in Yokohama on 18 September 1983. He joined J1 League club Yokohama F. Marinos from youth team in 2002. Although he debuted as center back in 2003, he could not play many matches behind Japan national team player Naoki Matsuda and Yuji Nakazawa. In 2006, he became a regular player as stopper of three backs defense with Matsuda and Nakazawa. From 2007, he played many matches as center back with Nakazawa of four backs defense. After that, he played many matches as center back for a long time of four backs or three backs defense. In 2013, Marinos won the 2nd place in J1 League and the champions in Emperor's Cup. However his opportunity to play decreased from 2015. He retired from football at the end of the 2019 season.

National team career
In November 2003, Kurihara was selected Japan U-20 national team for 2003 World Youth Championship. He played in 2 matches.

After 2006 World Cup, Ivica Osim became a new manager for Japan national team. His first match on August 9, Kurihara debuted for Japan against Trinidad and Tobago at the Tokyo National Stadium when he replaced Keisuke Tsuboi in the 60th minute. However he could not play at all in the match after the debut. In April 2010, he played for Japan under manager Takeshi Okada against Serbia for the first time in 4 years. Although he was not select Japan for 2010 World Cup, he played several matches as center back every year under Alberto Zaccheroni after 2010 World Cup. In 2013, he was selected for 2013 Confederations Cup and 2013 East Asian Cup. At East Asian Cup, he played all 3 matches and Japan won the champions. This tournament is his last game for Japan. He played 20 games and scored 3 goals for Japan until 2013.

Club statistics

1Includes Japanese Super Cup and A3 Champions Cup.

J.League firsts
 Appearance: 26 April 2003. Yokohama F. Marinos 1 vs. 3 JEF United Ichihara, Ichihara Stadium
 Goal: 20 August 2005. Yokohama F. Marinos 1 vs. 3 Júbilo Iwata, Shizuoka Stadium

National team statistics

International goals
Scores and results list Japan's goal tally first.

Honours

Club
Yokohama F. Marinos
J1 League: 2003, 2004
Emperor's Cup: 2013

Japan
EAFF East Asian Cup: 2013

References

External links

Japan National Football Team Database

Yuzo Kurihara – Yokohama F. Marinos official site 
Yuzo Kurihara  – Yahoo! Japan sports 

1983 births
Living people
Association football people from Kanagawa Prefecture
Japanese footballers
Japan youth international footballers
Japan international footballers
J1 League players
Yokohama F. Marinos players
2013 FIFA Confederations Cup players
Association football defenders